The Central Arnhem, an interim Australian bioregion, is located in the Northern Territory, comprising an area of  of central Arnhem Land in the Top End of the Northern Territory.

The bioregion is characterised by gently sloping terrain with scattered low hills and breakaways. Open forest and woodland vegetation is dominated by Darwin stringybark. Almost all the land is Aboriginal freehold. There are no major industries.

See also

 Geography of Australia

References

Arnhem Land
Arnhem Land tropical savanna
IBRA regions